Pflückuff is a former municipality in the district Nordsachsen, in Saxony, Germany. It was formed in 1994 by the merger of the former municipalities Beckwitz, Loßwig, Mehderitzsch, Staupitz and Weßnig. On 1 January 2009, it was absorbed into the town Torgau. Beckwitz, Loßwig, Mehderitzsch, Staupitz and Weßnig became Ortschaften (municipal divisions) of Torgau.

References

Former municipalities in Saxony
Torgau